Viru (also Romanized as Vīrū) is a village in Qaleh Miran Rural District, in the Central District of Ramian County, Golestan Province, Iran. At the 2006 census, its population was 762, in 175 families.

References 

Populated places in Ramian County